The British Camp Fire Girls' Association was a youth organisation in the UK. It was founded in 1921 and was an offshoot of Camp Fire USA. 

The association was the focus of an article in the March 1999 issue of Best of British magazine.

See also
Ruth Clark
Elsie J. Oxenham
Margaret Simey

References

External links
Evacuation to Ripon - contains a short account of a British Camp Fire Girls' group during World War II

Camp Fire (organization)
Scouting and Guiding in the United Kingdom

Youth organizations established in 1921
1921 establishments in the United Kingdom